Primary cutaneous marginal zone lymphomas represent a heterogeneous group of diseases characterized by solitary or multiple dermal or subcutaneous nodules.  Lymphomas included in this group are:

 Primary cutaneous immunocytoma
 Marginal zone B-cell lymphoma
 Mucosa-associated lymphoid tissue lymphoma

See also 
 Cutaneous B-cell lymphoma
 Skin lesion

References 

Lymphoid-related cutaneous conditions
Lymphoma